Non-Player Character Records is an accessory for the Dungeons & Dragons fantasy role-playing game.

Contents
Non-Player Character Records is a Dungeon Master's aid containing 32 character sheets for non-player characters, intended for first edition Advanced Dungeons & Dragons rules.

Publication history
Non-Player Character Records was designed by Harold Johnson, with a cover by Erol Otus, and was published by TSR in 1979 as a 32-page booklet.

Reception

Reviews

References

Character sheets
Dungeons & Dragons sourcebooks
Role-playing game supplements introduced in 1979